BTV, formerly known as Q Channel, QTV and BeritaSatu (literally translated as NewsOne) is an Indonesian digital free-to-air news network owned by the B Universe. The channel is the first Indonesia-based pay television channel.

History 

BTV was launched in 1998 as Q Channel (an abbreviation of Quick Channel) by PT Jaring Data Interaktif which was owned by one of RCTI and SCTV executive, Peter F. Gontha. The first program to be held was Q Inspiration. Much of the channel's programming is targeted towards Indonesian executives and the influential upper income segment of society. Aimed at decision makers, the channel mostly features talk shows and infotainment programs related to business, economy, politics, lifestyle, and entertainment.

On 15 September 2005, the channel name has been changed to QTV. On 1 September 2011, QTV transformed into BeritaSatu, with became a news channel. The launch was officially held on 3 September 2011.

The transformation making the channel competes with terrestrial news networks at the time Metro TV and tvOne as well as news networks that came later.

On 11 October 2022 at 09.53 WIB, BeritaSatu officially changed its name to BTV after the inauguration of the Investor Daily Summit 2022 by Indonesian President Joko Widodo.

Programming 
 BeritaSatu
 BeritaSatu Pagi 
 BeritaSatu Siang
 BeritaSatu Sore
 BeritaSatu Malam
 BeritaSatu Terkini 
 BeritaSatu Breaking News 
 BeritaSatu Spesial
 Asal Usul
 Figur Publik
 Di Balik Kisah
 Jendela Dunia
 Saksi Mata
 Lunch Talk
 Berita Viral
 ONE Championship
 Kasih Paham
 Obrolan Pagi
 Obrolan Malam
 Jalan Dakwah Gus Mitfah
 Indekos
 CLBK (Cak Lontong Blak-Blakan)
 Ujung-ujungnya Dangdut
 30 Minutes with...
 60 Minutes with...
 Film Pendek Indonesia
 Esensi
 Iqra
 Epik (Enjoy Populer Musik)
 Delta
 Nyari Makan

Presenters

Current 
 Bunaya Saifudin
 Budhius S Pilang
 Christian Reinaldo (former Trans TV)
 Agung Hardiansyah (former Indosiar and GTV anchor)
 Ahmad Murody
 Rike Amru
 Ariana Herawati
 Joy Citradewi (former CNN Indonesia)
 Ellyza Hasan
 Tascha Liudmila (former MetroTV)
 Rudy Andanu
 Valerina Daniel (former SCTV)
 Indri Sukardi
 Carlos Michael
 Rima Safira
 Ira Syarif
 Dora Edward
 Louisa Kusnandar
 Stefani Ginting (former Kompas TV and RTV)
 Donny de Keizer
 Sakti Fajar
 Isabella Fawzi
 Andra Lesmana
 Wicky Adrian
 Chakry Miller
 Julita Telaumbanua
 Nastiti Lestari
 Poppy Zeidra
 Pramadhika Samudera
 Rolando Sambuaga
 Tezar Aditya
 Yassirni Syarifah
 Fristian Griec (former Indosiar, RTV, Kompas TV, TVRI)

Former 
 Ade Mulya
 Amie Ardhini
 Anggi Pasaribu (now at MNC News)
 Bima Marzuki
 Francisca Rathy
 Olivia Marzuki (now at CNA)
 Tengku Fiola
 Winda Irawan
 Kenia Gusnaeni (now at RTV)
 Diaz Kaslina
 Nova Rini
 Ratu Nabilla (now at MNC News)
 Fitri Megantara (now at MetroTV)
 Nunung Setiyani
 Cynthia Rompas (now at Kompas TV)
 Awis Mranani
 Anie Rahmi
 Veronica Moniaga
 Amanda Cininta (now at Metro Globe Network)
 Kanty Widjaja
 Kevin Egan (now at MetroTV)

See also 
 List of television stations in Indonesia

References

External links 
 Official website

24-hour television news channels in Indonesia
Television networks in Indonesia
Television channels and stations established in 1998